Heungin-dong is a legal dong, or neighbourhood of the Jung-gu district in Seoul, South Korea and governed by its administrative dong, Sindang 1-dong.

Chungmu Arts Hall
Chungmu Arts Hall is multi-purpose cultural complex located in Heungin-dong, near Sindang Station. Facilities includes a 1,231 seats Grand Theater, 327 seats Black Theater and 258 seats Blue Theater; Chungmu Gallery designed for installations and experimental artwork; sport hall with gymnasium, fitness room, dance studios and swimming pool; and the Chungmu Academy.

Events
 Lee Min Woo of Shinhwa held a series of concerts, titled M's Acoustic & Unplugged from 15 to 25 October 2009.
 Musical The Three Musketeers from 15 December 2010 to mid-January 2011, Kyuhyun of Super Junior rotated with TRAX's Jay "Typhoon" Kim as D'Artagnan, along with Yoo Jun Sang, Im Ki Jun, Kim Mu Yul and Dana Hong.
 Musical Jack the Ripper played at the Grand Theater from 5 July to 14 August 2011, with Ahn Jae-wook, Um Ki-joon, Lee Ji-hoon and Sungmin of Super Junior rotating in the lead role of Daniel.

See also
Administrative divisions of South Korea

References

External links
 Jung-gu Official site in English
 Jung-gu Official site
 Jung-gu Tour Guide from the Official site
 Status quo of Jung-gu 
 Resident offices and maps of Jung-gu 

Neighbourhoods of Jung-gu, Seoul